Wyspa przetrwania: Fidżi is the 2nd season of the Polish version of Survivor and the 1st to air since 2004.

This is the 2nd version of the show but the 1st to use the format of Koh-Lanta instead of the previous incarnation which used the format of Expedition Robinson. This season takes place on the Yasawa Islands in the country of Fiji and aired on Polsat. 16 contestants from all over Poland take part to see who can last 30 days and win the grand prize of 150,000 zł.

The season premiered on 8 September 2017 and concluded on 10 November 2017 where Katarzyna Cebula won against Paweł Poręba in a 6-1 jury vote to win the grand prize and be crowned Sole Survivor.

Contestants

Notes

References

External links

Polish reality television series
2017 Polish television series debuts
Poland
Television shows filmed in Fiji